Dmitry Borisovich (11 September 1253, in Rostov – 1294, in Rostov) was a Russian nobleman. He was the eldest of the three sons of Prince Rostov Boris Vasylkovych from his marriage to Princess Maria Yaroslavna of Murom. He was Prince of Rostov (1278–1286 and 1288–1294) and Prince of Uglich (1285–1288).

Sources
http://www.biografija.ru/show_bio.aspx?id=112862

1253 births
1294 deaths
13th-century princes in Kievan Rus'
People from Rostov
Princes of Rostov
Rurik dynasty